Air Force Common Admission Test is conducted  by Air Force Selection Board  for recruitment of ground and flying  staff of Indian Air Force (IAF). Air Force Selection Board is the recruitment wing of Indian Air Force.

Objective 

Air Force Common Admission Test is conducted by Air Force selection Board  for recruitment of ground staff and flying branches  of the Indian Air Force (IAF). Qualified applicants in the Test should mandatorily register for the five day Air Force Selection Board process.

Air Force Common Admission Test (AFCAT) is conducted in two stages. In first stage it is written test and second stage involves testing process . The call letters to report Dehradun, Mysuru, Gandhinagar, Varanasi, and Guwahati,(any one of the selection boards) is sent to qualified candidates of testing process.

Eligibility 

(a) Candidates applying for the examination should ensure that they fulfill all the eligibility conditions for admission to the examination. Their admission at all the stages of examination viz. Written examination and SSB test will be purely provisional, subject to their satisfying the prescribed eligibility conditions. If on verification at any time before or after the written examination or AFSB Testing, it is found that they do not fulfil any of the eligibility conditions, their candidature will be cancelled by the IAF.

(b) Simply issuing an Admit Card or Call Up letter to a candidate does not guarantee acceptance of their candidature by the Indian Air Force. The following are the required educational and other qualifications for applying for the Flying and Ground Staff positions at the Air Force Selection Board.:

Eligibility Conditions.

(a) Nationality. Candidate must be a citizen of India as per Indian citizenship act, 1955.

(b) Age.

(i) Flying Branch through AFCAT and NCC Special Entry: 20 to 24 years as on 0. Upper age limit for candidates holding valid and current Commercial Pilot License issued by DGCA (India) is relaxable upto 26 years

(ii) Ground Duty (Technical & Non-Technical) Branch: 20 to 26 years as on 1 July 2023 i.e. born between 02 July1997 to 1 July 2003 (both dates inclusive).

(iii) Marital Status: Candidates below 25 years of age must be unmarried at the time of commencement of course. Widows/ Widowers and divorcees (with or without encumbrances) below 25 years of age are also not eligible. A candidate who marries subsequent to the date of his application though successful at SSB or medical will not be eligible for training. A candidate who marries during the period of training shall be discharged and will be liable to refund all expenditure incurred on him by the Government. Married candidates above 25 years of age are eligible to apply but during training period they will neither be provided married accommodation nor can they live out with family.

(iv) The date of birth accepted by the IAF is that entered in the Matriculation or Secondary School Leaving Certificate or in a certificate recognized by an Indian University as equivalent to Matriculation or in an extract from a Register of Matriculates maintained by a University, the extract must be certified by the proper authority of the University or in the Higher Secondary or an equivalent examination certificate. No other document related to age like horoscopes, affidavits, birth extracts from Municipal Corporation, service records and likewise will be accepted.

Flying Branch 

Following is the eligibility for applying for the AFCAT for getting selections into Flying Branch of Indian Air Force

(i) Flying Branch. Candidates should have mandatorily passed with a minimum of 50% marks each in Math's and Physics at 10+2 level and

(a) Graduation with minimum three years degree course in any discipline from a recognized University with a minimum of 60% marks or equivalent. OR

(b) BE/B Tech degree (Four years course) from a recognized University with a minimum of 60% marks or equivalent. OR

(c) Candidates who have cleared Section A & B examination of Associate Membership of Institution of Engineers (India) or Aeronautical Society of India from a recognized University with a minimum of 60% marks or equivalent.

Ground Duty (Technical) Branch 

Following is the eligibility for applying for the AFCAT for getting selections into Ground Duty (Technical) Branch of Indian Air Force

(aa) Aeronautical Engineer (Electronics) {AE (L)}.

Candidates with a minimum of 50% marks each in Physics and Mathematics at 10+2 level and a minimum of four years degree graduation/integrated post-graduation qualification in Engineering/ Technology from recognized University

OR cleared Sections A and B examination of Associate Membership of Institution of Engineers (India) or Aeronautical Society of India or Graduate membership examination of the Institution of Electronics and Telecommunication Engineers by actual studies with a minimum of 60% marks or equivalent in the following disciplines:-

(aaa) Applied Electronics & Instrumentation.

(aab) Communication Engineering.

(aac) Computer Engineering/Technology.

(aad) Computer Engineering & Application.

(aae) Computer Science and Engineering/Technology.

(aaf) Electrical and Computer Engineering.

(aag) Electrical and Electronics Engineering.

(aah) Electrical Engineering.

(aaj) Electronics Engineering/ Technology.

(aak) Electronics Science and Engineering.

(aal) Electronics.

(aam) Electronics and Communication Engineering.

(aan) Electronics and Computer Science.

(aao) Electronics and/or Telecommunication Engineering.

(aap) Electronics and/or Telecommunication Engineering (Microwave).

(aaq) Electronics and Computer Engineering.

(aar) Electronics Communication and Instrumentation Engineering.

(aas) Electronics Instrument & Control.

(aat) Electronics Instrument & Control Engineering.

(aau) Instrumentation & Control Engineering.

(aav) Instrument & Control Engineering.

(aaw) Information Technology.

(aax) Spacecraft Technology.

(aay) Engineering Physics.

(aaz) Electric Power and Machinery Engineering.

(aba) Infotech Engineering.'

(abb) Cyber Security.

(ab) Aeronautical Engineer (Mechanical) {AE (M)}. Candidates with a minimum of 50% marks each in Physics and Mathematics at 10+2 level and a minimum of four years degree graduation/integrated post-graduation qualification in Engineering/Technology from recognised University

OR cleared Sections A & B examination of Associate Membership of Institution of Engineers (India) or Aeronautical Society of India by actual studies with a minimum of 60% marks or equivalent in the following disciplines:-

(aaa) Aerospace Engineering.

(aab) Aeronautical Engineering.

(aac) Aircraft Maintenance Engineering.

(aad) Mechanical Engineering.

(aae) Mechanical Engineering and Automation.

(aaf) Mechanical Engineering (Production).

(aag) Mechanical Engineering (Repair and Maintenance). (

aah) Mechatronics.

(aaj) Industrial Engineering.

(aak) Manufacturing Engineering.

(aal) Production and Industrial Engineering.

(aam) Materials Science and Engineering.

(aan) Metallurgical and Materials Engineering.

(aao) Aerospace and Applied Mechanics.

(aap) Automotive Engineering.

(aaq) Robotics

(aar) Nanotechnology

(aas) Rubber Technology and Rubber Engineering.

Ground Duty (Non-Technical) Branches 

Following is the eligibility for applying for the AFCAT for getting selections into Ground Duty (Non-Technical) Branches of Indian Air Force

Administration

Applicant should have

 Passed 10+2 and
 Graduation course having minimum three years degree cours from a recognised university in any subjects and secured  60% minimum marks or more.

Education

Applicant should

 Have passed 10+2 and
 60% marks in Graduation in any discipline, and.
 Post graduate degree  any discipline with 50% marks which may include integrated courses offered in post graduation (with single degree with no permission to exit and lateral entry).

Meteorology

 Passed 10+2 and
 Has done Postgraduate Degree with 50% minimum marks in all papers combined in stream having Agricultural Meteorology/Science/Geo-physics/Oceanography/Statistics/  Mathematics/ Geography/Computer Applications/ Applied Physics/  Meteorology/ Ecology & Environment/ Environmental Biology/Environmental Science(had Maths and Physics as subjects at Graduation Level securing 55% minimum marks in each).
 Age Limit- Applicant should be in the age group of 20–26 years on the date of application.

Selection Process

Physical fitness for Air Force Selection Board 

Applicants should have ability to do ten push-ups , run a distance of 1.6 kilometres in 10 minutes and  perform 3 chin-ups.

The testing process of Air Force Selection Board consists of two stages:

Step 1 Testing:

(i) Test for Officer Intelligence Rating (OIR)

Non-Verbal and Verbal reasoning of a candidate is done through the test of OIR which also helps in evaluating the intelligence and competence ability of the applicant.

– Applicant is required to solve the mock test containing 40-50 questions in 10–20 minutes.

– The question paper will involve embedded figure, questions on completion of series, having odd figures to set, and other topics on reasoning.

– Suggested to attempt maximum questions in the absence of negative marking.

– Suggested to avoid extra time in case of doubtful and confusing questions.

(ii) Discussion and Test for Picture perception

Test involves picture viewing for 30 seconds, noting down details in 1 minute, and short para writing on random topics for 4 minutes and finally the applicants should attend group discussion and collate information in narration to make a story.

– Every portion of the picture should be focussed in 30 seconds as it helps in evaluating the speed and coordination of the applicant.

– Recommended to include all aspects during story writing avoiding technical and complex language.

– Using short forms like Male(M)/female(F)/person(P) and + for positive,- for Negative 0 for neutral for filling forms.

– Be calm, composed and confident and gain attention during simultaneous group discussion of applicants.

Step 2 Testing:

(i) Test for determining Psychological ability

To ascertain the sound mental ability and medical condition of the applicants Air Force Selection Board conducts the test for determining Psychological ability of the applicants on the noon of first day  and later document verification is done. It is followed with group tests and interview which lasts for a period of five days.

(ii) Interview and Group Discussion

– Awareness of the applicant on reason behind applying for AFCAT, and the reason behind choosing the career in Indian Air Force.

– Up to date information on  current affairs and historical facts relating to Indian Air Force.

– Promptness and honesty in answering the questions during interview.

– Enhancing interview skills based on previous questions asked.

(iii) Computerised Pilot Selection System (CPSS)

For applicants of flying branch.

– Requirements of promptness and attention to solve MCQs.

– Practicing with timer on sample MCQs.

– Suggested for a good sleep before test.

– Familiarity on using joy stick, well versed with computer games basics as  maneuvering skills is improved.

Next step is medical examination of candidate completing both stages of test. All India merit list of the successful applicants will be generated based on the outcome in the tests after vacancies are determined in all branches is found out . The results of the candidate are displayed in AFCAT candidate login portal.

Examination Fee and Procedure 

An amount of Rs 250 as an application fee of is charged from the AFCAT applicants and can be paid through either net banking or credit or debit card or any of the payment gateways. Applicants are suggested to follow the instructions, guidance or steps in the gateway , and keep the transaction details in either printed or digital form.

Examination is conducted in February and August of each year.

Related Links 

 Indian Air Force

References

External links 
 Official Website

Examinations in India
Indian Air Force